The Windstar YF-80 is an American single seat homebuilt replica of the Lockheed F-80.

Design and development

The YF-80 is a two-thirds scale replica of a Lockheed F-80 or T-33. The aircraft is a composite construction, single engine, low wing design with retractable tricycle landing gear. The tip tanks are removable for aerobatic flight. The aircraft is powered by a Chevy 350 V-8 turbocharged engine driving a turbine thrust section. The thrust section is driven by belts with high gear ratios to drive the turbine closer to the rotational speed it was originally designed for.

The aircraft project was intended to showcase the Davis engine technology with a static prototype displayed in 1977. Burt Rutan was approached to build the composite fuselage, but the US$240,000 cost estimate was declined. Davis attempted to produce a production prototype fuselage for US$80,000. By 1987 the project was not complete, resulting in a court case between investors. The prototype was re-engined with a Turbomeca Marboré II turbine engine as the Stargate YT-33.

Variants
Stargate YT-33 (MT-33) 
Turbine powered prototype

Specifications (YF-80)

References

Homebuilt aircraft
Single-engined pusher aircraft
Low-wing aircraft
Ducted fan-powered aircraft
1970s United States sport aircraft